Southwood Junior-Senior High School is a combined Junior and Senior High School in Wabash, Indiana.

Demographics
The demographic breakdown of the 516 students enrolled in 2014-15 was:
Male - 48.1%
Female - 51.9%
Native American/Alaskan - 0%
Asian/Pacific islanders - 0%
Black - 0.4%
Hispanic - 1.7%
White - 96.5%
Multiracial - 1.4%

30.6% of the students were eligible for free or reduced lunch.

Athletics
The Southwood Knights compete in the Three Rivers Conference.  The school colors are red, grey and black.  The following IHSAA sanctioned sports are offered:

Baseball (boys)
Basketball (boys and girls)
Cross country (boys and girls)
Football (boys)
State champions - 2002
Golf (boys and girls)
Softball (girls)
Tennis (girls)
Track (boys and girls)
Volleyball (girls)
Wrestling (boys)

See also
 List of high schools in Indiana

References

External links
Southwood Junior-Senior High School

Public high schools in Indiana
Public middle schools in Indiana
Education in Wabash County, Indiana
Buildings and structures in Wabash County, Indiana